The Minnesota State Mavericks women's hockey ice program represents Minnesota State University, Mankato, and participate in the Western Collegiate Hockey Association.

History
In October 2010, Kathleen Rogan registered a hat trick as the Mavericks defeated No. 6-ranked North Dakota by a 4–2 margin. This was the Mavericks first hat trick since Ashley Young registered one against Bemidji State in 2008.

In 2018 and 2019, the Mavericks played in the Women's Face-Off Classic game hosted by the U.S. Hockey Hall of Fame Museum. In 2018, they faced off against Bemidji State, at the Brainerd Essentia Health Sports Center.  In 2019, they played against the Minnesota Golden Gophers, at the Dakotah! Ice Center at Prior Lake, Minnesota.

On February 8, 2020, the Mavericks beat the Wisconsin Badgers, ranked #1 in the nation at the time, by a score of 3-1, on home ice.  Maverick goalie Calla Frank made 35 saves, and had a shut-out through two periods. Minnesota State had not defeated Wisconsin since March 1, 2014.

Year by year

Current roster
As of August 21, 2022.

Awards and honors
Alli Altmann, WCHA Defensive Player of the Week (Week of February 17, 2010)  
Alli Altmann, WCHA Defensive Player of the Week (Week of December 14, 2011)
Katie Beaudy, WCHA Student-Athlete of the Year (1999-00)
Corbin Boyd, WCHA Student-Athlete of the Year (2018-2019)
Danielle Butters, All-WCHA Third Team (2013-2014)
Megan Hinze, WCHA Defensive Player of the Month (December 2016)
Kelsey King, WCHA Rookie of the Month (October 2019)
Kelsey King, WCHA Rookie of the Month (November 2019)
Emmi Leinonen, WCHA Offensive Player of the Week (Week of October 21, 2009) 
Abigail Levy, All-WCHA Second Team (2018-2019)
Jamie Nelson, 2020-21 WCHA Rookie of the Year 
Kathleen Rogan, WCHA Rookie of the Week (Week of October 27, 2010)
Kathleen Rogan, WCHA Rookie of the Week (Week of November 17, 2010) 
Nina Tikkinen, WCHA Player of the Week, (Week of November 10, 2010) 
Nina Tikkinen, WCHA Player of the Week, (Week of November 17, 2010) 
McKenzie Sederberg, WCHA Defenseman of the Week (Week of February 14, 2020)
Lauren Smith, All-WCHA Third Team (2012-2013)
Shari Vogt, All-American Second Team (2003-2004)
Shari Vogt, All-WCHA Team (2002-2003)
Shari Vogt, All-WCHA Team (2003-2004)
Anna Wilgren, WCHA Defenseman of the Week (Week of October 25)
Anna Wilgren, WCHA Defenseman of the Month (November 2019)
Ashley Young, 2010 Frozen Four Skills Competition participant

International
Alli Altmann was the goaltending coach for the US National Women's Ice Hockey U-18 team, in 2018, 2019, and 2020. She also was goaltending coach in 2017 for the US Women's U-18 Select team in the US-Canada series.
Nina Tikkinen played for Finland’s 2010 Winter Olympic Hockey Team.

Mavericks in professional hockey

See also 

 Minnesota State Mavericks men's ice hockey
 WCHA women's ice hockey

References

External links 

 
Ice hockey teams in Minnesota